Amajari is a municipality located in the northwest of the state of Roraima in Brazil. Its population is 13,185 and its area is 28,472 km². It is the westernmost municipality in Roraima.

The municipality of Amajari is a region of 8 indigenous segments with a total of 19 indigenous communities living there. The present ethnic groups are the Macuxi, Wapichana, Sapará and Taurepang people. The 8 indigenous segments: TI Araçá, TI Ouro, TI Anaro, TI Ponta da Serra, TI Aningal, TI Garagem, TI Santa Inês and TI Ananás. The indigenous communities that are located in the region are: Araçá, Mutamba, Mangueira, Três Corações, Guariba, Anaro, Ponta da Serra, Urucuri, Juraci, Nova União, Ouro, San Francisco, Cajueiro, Garagem, Ananás, Leão de Ouro, Santa Inês, Aningal and Vida Nova.

Main townships 
The following is a list of the main populated places within the municipality and their population according to the census of 2010.
 1,219 inhabitants - Vila Brasil
 116 inhabitants - Vila Tepequém
 587 inhabitants - Vila Três Corações
 693 inhabitants - Vila do Trairão

Notable people 
 Suely Campos (1953), politician and former governor of Roraima

References

External links 
Official site (in Portuguese)

Municipalities in Roraima
Populated places established in 1995